Hellen Makumba (born 16 May 1996) is a Zambian athlete. She competed in the women's 100 metres event at the 2019 World Athletics Championships. She also represented Zambia at the 2019 African Games and she competed in the women's 100 metres and women's 4 × 100 metres relay events.

References

External links

1996 births
Living people
Zambian female sprinters
Place of birth missing (living people)
World Athletics Championships athletes for Zambia
Athletes (track and field) at the 2019 African Games
African Games competitors for Zambia